The Jebrail uezd, also known after 1905 as the Karyagino uezd, was a county (uezd) of the Elizavetpol Governorate of the Russian Empire with its center in Jebrail (Jabrayil) from 1873 until its formal abolition in 1921 by the Soviet authorities.

Geography
The Jebrayil uezd was located in the southeastern part of Elizavetpol Governorate bordering its Shusha uezd to the north, Zangezur uezd to the west, Baku Governorate to the east, and Persia to the south. The area of the county was 2922.6 square verst. The northwestern part of the county was mountainous. Mount Ziyarat or Dizapayt reaches 8,186 feet. The higher ground was usually used for pastures. The whole county was located within the Araz river basin. The tributaries of Araz, Kendalan, Kuru-chay, Chereken, Gozlu-chay and Hakari-chay were utilized for irrigation.

History
The territory of the county had previously formed a part of the Karabakh Khanate until 1813, when according to Gulistan Treaty it was annexed into the Russian Empire as part of the Karabakh province. In 1840, the province was transformed into Shusha uezd and in 1873 the southern part of Shusha uezd was detached and established as the separate Jabrail uezd. The administrative center was Jabrail, which was used as a customs office on the border with Persian Empire which the district bordered.

In 1905, the Jabrail uezd was officially renamed the Karyagino uezd as its center was transferred to the town Karyagino (present-day Fizuli), which was renamed from its original Karabulak in honor of Colonel Pavel Karyagin, a distinguished hero of the Russo-Turkish War (1768-1774) and the Russo-Persian War (1804-1813).

After the dissolution of the Russian Empire and the formation of the independent Transcaucasian republics, including the Azerbaijan Democratic Republic in 1918, the western mountainous districts of the Elizavetpol Governorate including the Shusha, Zangezur, Jebrail, Jevanshir, Kazakh and Elizavetpol uezds became subject to intense territorial disputes between Armenia and Azerbaijan throughout 1918-1920, both of whom included these areas in their territorial pretensions that they presented in memorandums to the Paris Peace Conference.

Since the collapse of Russian authority in the Transcaucasus, the mountainous portion of the county which was overwhelmingly Armenian was governed by the de facto Karabakh Council which vehemently rejected Ottoman and Azerbaijani attempts to subordinate the region. However, following the arrival of British forces in Transcaucasia, the Karabakh Council reluctantly submitted to provisional Azerbaijani rule through the Governor-Generalship of Karabakh, led by Dr. Khosrov bey Sultanov, due to the exerted British pressure on the council in August 1919.

After the establishment of Soviet rule in Azerbaijan, the town Karabulag which was designated as the new capital of the district was renamed to Sardar, then to Karyagino and finally to Fizuli in 1959, as the capital of Fizuli Rayon.

In the aftermath of the dissolution of the Soviet Union, The area of the Fizuli Rayon was occupied in August 1993 by ethnic Armenian forces of the de facto Nagorno-Karabakh (Artsakh) Republic during the First Nagorno-Karabakh War, however, the area was recaptured by Azerbaijani armed forces during the 2020 Nagorno-Karabakh war and reincorporated into the contemporary Republic of Azerbaijan.

Administrative divisions 
The subcounties (uchastoks) of the Jebrail uezd in 1912 were as follows:

Economy 
There were 178 settlements in the county, the population of which was primarily engaged in agricultural farming, gardening, sericulture. According to statistical data from 1891, there were 37,000 of great and 108,000 of small cattle.

Demographics

Russian Empire Census 
The majority of the population indicated Tatar to be their mother tongue, with a significant Armenian speaking minority.

Kavkazskiy kalendar 
The statistics indicated Shia Muslims to be the plurality of the population with significant Armenian, Sunni Muslim, and Russian minorities:

1926 Soviet census 
According to Soviet census from 1926, the population fell to 75,371—due to the separation of the territory of the Nagorno-Karabakh Autonomous Oblast from the district—of which 71,725 were Turks (i.e. Azerbaijanis), 625 - Armenians, 1,089 - Russians, 520 - Persians.

Notes

References

Bibliography 

Geographic history of Azerbaijan
States and territories established in 1873
1921 disestablishments
Uezds of Elizavetpol Governorate
Uezds of the Soviet Union